The Green Energy (Definition and Promotion) Act 2009 (c 19) is an Act of the Parliament of the United Kingdom. The Act is intended to reduce carbon emissions in order to reduce climate change, to increase the diversity and security of energy supplies, to reduce fuel poverty, and to contribute to meeting the EU 2020 renewable energy targets.

Section 1 - Definition and promotion of green energy
Sections 1(2) and (3) define the expression "green energy" for the purposes of this Act.

Sections 2 to 4
These sections make provision for the promotion of microgeneration.

Section 5 - Interpretation
This section defines the words and expressions "dwellinghouse", "energy efficiency measure", "equipment", "fuel poverty", "the GPDO" and "renewable or low-carbon source" for the purposes of the Act.

Section 6 - Short title, commencement and extent
Section 6(1) authorises the citation of the Act by a short title.

Section 6(2) provides that the Act came into force at the end of the period of two months that began on the day that it was passed. The word "months" means calendar months. The day (that is to say, 12 November 2009) on which the Act was passed (that is to say, received royal assent) is included in the period of two months. This means that the Act came into force on 12 January 2010.

Section 6(3) provides for its extent.

References
Halsbury's Statutes,

External links
The Green Energy (Definition and Promotion) Act 2009, as amended from the National Archives.
The Green Energy (Definition and Promotion) Act 2009, as originally enacted from the National Archives.

United Kingdom Acts of Parliament 2009
Sustainable energy